Idioglossa argodora is a species of moth of the family Batrachedridae. It is known from India.

The wingspan is about 10 mm.

References

Moths described in 1913
Batrachedridae